Manistee County is a county located in the U.S. state of Michigan. As of the 2020 Census, the population was 25,032. The county seat is Manistee. The county is named for the Manistee River. Manistee County is part of Northern Michigan and has a shoreline on Lake Michigan.

History 

Manistee County was set off in 1840 from Michilimackinac County as an unorganized county. In 1851, it was attached to Grand Traverse County for legal purposes. Manistee County was organized in its own right on February 13, 1855.

Etymology 
The name "Manistee" is from an Ojibwe word first applied to the principal river of the county. The derivation is not certain, but it may be from ministigweyaa, "river with islands at its mouth".

Historical markers
There are thirteen recognized Michigan historical markers in the county:
 Harriet Quimby Childhood Home
 John J. Makinen Bottle House
 First Congregational Church, Manistee
 Great Fire of 1871
 Holy Trinity Episcopal Church
 Holy Trinity Episcopal Church Rectory
 Kaleva, Michigan
 Manistee City Library
 Manistee Fire Hall
 Our Saviour's Lutheran Church
 Ramsdell Theatre
 Trinity Lutheran Church [Arcadia]
 William Douglas House

Geography
Manistee County is considered to be part of Northern Michigan.

Adjacent counties
By land
Benzie County - north
Grand Traverse County - northeast
Wexford County - east
Lake County - southeast
Mason County - south
By water
Manitowoc County, Wisconsin - southwest
Kewaunee County, Wisconsin - west

Protected areas
 Manistee National Forest (part)
 Nordhouse Dunes Wilderness
 Orchard Beach State Park

Transportation

Airport
Manistee County-Blacker Airport is approximately 3 miles (4.8 km) northeast of Manistee.

Major highways
 runs through Manistee and Bear Lake, paralleling Lake Michigan further inland than M-22.
 is a diagonal highway, running southeast–northwest across the northeast corner of the county. It enters Benzie County to the north and Wexford County to the east.
Previously, an additional highway, M-110, was designated to run from US 31 at Parkdale to Orchard Beach State Park. However, the highway was returned to local control in 2003.

Bicycle routes
 comes from Mason County and goes through Manistee, Onekama, and Arcadia to proceed north to Benzie County with M-22

Demographics

As of the census of 2000, there were 24,527 people, 9,860 households, and 6,714 families residing in the county.  The population density was 45 people per square mile (17/km2).  There were 14,272 housing units at an average density of 26 per square mile (10/km2).  The racial makeup of the county was 94.16% White, 1.63% Black or African American, 1.30% Native American, 0.32% Asian, 0.03% Pacific Islander, 1.01% from other races, and 1.55% from two or more races.  2.61% of the population were Hispanic or Latino of any race. 23.5% were of German, 16.9% Polish, 8.8% English, 8.8% American and 7.1% Irish ancestry. 96.2% spoke English and 2.3% Spanish as their first language.

There were 9,860 households, out of which 27.40% had children under the age of 18 living with them, 55.10% were married couples living together, 9.10% had a female householder with no husband present, and 31.90% were non-families. 27.30% of all households were made up of individuals, and 13.20% had someone living alone who was 65 years of age or older.  The average household size was 2.37 and the average family size was 2.86.

In the county, the population was spread out, with 22.60% under the age of 18, 6.70% from 18 to 24, 26.30% from 25 to 44, 26.30% from 45 to 64, and 18.10% who were 65 years of age or older.  The median age was 42 years. For every 100 females there were 103.40 males.  For every 100 females age 18 and over, there were 102.00 males.

The median income for a household in the county was $34,208, and the median income for a family was $41,664. Males had a median income of $33,211 versus $20,851 for females. The per capita income for the county was $17,204.  About 6.90% of families and 10.30% of the population were below the poverty line, including 13.50% of those under age 18 and 7.90% of those age 65 or over.

Government 

The county government operates the jail, maintains rural roads, operates the major local courts, keeps files of deeds and mortgages, maintains vital records, administers public health regulations, and participates with the state in the provision of welfare and other social services. The county board of commissioners controls the budget but has only limited authority to make laws or ordinances.  In Michigan, most local government functions — police and fire, building and zoning, tax assessment, street maintenance, etc. — are the responsibility of individual cities and townships.

Manistee County was one of two counties in the United States in which James M. Cox and Charles Evans Hughes both won — the other being Polk County, North Carolina.

Elected officials
 Prosecuting Attorney: Jason Haag
 Sheriff: Brian Gutowski 
 County Clerk: Jill Nowak
 County Treasurer: Rachel Nelson
 Register of Deeds: Penny Pepera
 Drain Commissioner: Ken Hilliard
 County Surveyor: Patrick Bentley

(information as of February 2012)

Fire departments and emergency medical services

County ambulance service 
As of early 2021 North Flight EMS has since transferred the primary ambulance service to Mobile Medical Response.

Fire departments 

 Arcadia Township Fire Department
 Bear Lake Township Fire Department
 City of Manistee Fire Department
 Cleon Township Fire Department
 Dickson Township Fire Department
 East Lake Township Fire Department
 Filer Township Fire Department
 Manistee Township Fire Department
 Maple Grove Township Fire Department
 Norman Township Fire Department
 Onekama Township Fire Department
 Stronach Township Fire Department

Communities

City
Manistee (county seat)

Villages
Bear Lake
Copemish
Eastlake
Kaleva
Onekama

Census-designated places

Arcadia
Brethren
Filer City
Oak Hill
Parkdale
Stronach
Wellston

Other unincorporated communities

Harlan
Marilla
Norwalk
Pierport
Pleasanton
Portage Point
Red Park
Wick-A-Te-Wah
Williamsport

Townships

Arcadia Township
Bear Lake Township
Brown Township
Cleon Township
Dickson Township
Filer Charter Township
Manistee Township
Maple Grove Township
Marilla Township
Norman Township
Onekama Township
Pleasanton Township
Springdale Township
Stronach Township

Education
School districts include:
 Bear Lake School District
 Benzie County Central School
 Kaleva Norman Dickson School District
 Manistee Area Schools
 Mason County Eastern District
 Mesick Consolidated Schools
 Onekama Consolidated Schools

See also
 List of Michigan State Historic Sites in Manistee County, Michigan
National Register of Historic Places listings in Manistee County, Michigan

References

Further reading

Manistee County - Official Website

 
Michigan counties
1855 establishments in Michigan
Populated places established in 1855